Banksia echinata is a species of shrub that is endemic to Western Australia. It has serrated leaves with nine to twenty-five sharply pointed, triangular teeth on each side, heads of about fifty pale yellow flowers and sparsely hairy follicles.

Description
Banksia echinata is a shrub that typically grows to a height of  but does not form a lignotuber.

Taxonomy and naming
This banksia was first formally described in 1996 by Alex George in the journal Nuytsia and given the name Dryandra echinata from specimens he collected near the Brand Highway and Moore River National Park in 1986. In 2007, Austin Mast and Kevin Thiele transferred all the dryandras to the genus Banksia and this species became Banksia echinata. The specific epithet (echinata) is a Latin word meaning "armed with many prickles", referring to the teeth on the leaves.

Distribution and habitat
Banksia echinata grows in kwongan and open woodland between Regans Ford, New Norcia and Gingin in the Avon Wheatbelt, Geraldton Sandplains, Jarrah Forest and Swan Coastal Plain biogeographic regions.

Conservation status
This banksia is classified as "not threatened" by the Government of Western Australia Department of Parks and Wildlife.

References

echinata
Endemic flora of Western Australia
Eudicots of Western Australia
Plants described in 1996
Taxa named by Kevin Thiele